The Disney Collection: the Best-Loved Songs from Disney Motion Pictures, Television, and Theme Parks is a series of albums which were released three times. The first was a two-volume set released in 1987 from Disneyland Records. The second time was released in 1991 as a three-volume set from Walt Disney Records. The third time was released in 2006 as a four-volume set also from Walt Disney Records. It doesn't include songs from The Adventures of Ichabod and Mr. Toad, Alice in Wonderland, and The Sword in the Stone.

1987 Edition

Volume One

Volume Two

1991 Edition

Volume One (Orange)

Volume Two (Pink)

Volume Three (Teal)

2006 Edition

Volume One (Red)

Volume Two (Green)

See also 
 Classic Disney: 60 Years of Musical Magic

References 

Walt Disney Records compilation albums